The Poicu is a right tributary of the river Crișul Repede in Romania. It discharges into the Crișul Repede in Ciucea.

References

Rivers of Romania
Rivers of Cluj County